Louise Gullifer  is a British legal academic and barrister who is Rouse Ball Professor of English Law at the University of Cambridge. She is the first woman to hold this professorship and was formerly Professor of Commercial Law at the University of Oxford. She is known for her contributions to English law both as an academic, and for representing the United Kingdom as delegate to United Nations Commission on International Trade Law and UNIDROIT. She is a Bencher of Gray's Inn.

Education and career 
Gullifer decided to pursue a career as a barrister from the age of fourteen, after watching a television programme about the English Bar. She graduated with a first-class honours Bachelor of Arts in Jurisprudence in 1982 and subsequently a Bachelor of Civil Law in 1983, both from Hertford College, Oxford. Upon graduation, she practiced law as a barrister for six years. In 1991, she took up an opportunity to assist Roy Goode in setting up a commercial law course at Oxford, following which she was offered a permanent teaching position. She was a fellow of Brasenose College, Oxford, from 1994 to 1997.

In 2000, she took up a fellowship at Harris Manchester College, Oxford and was appointed Professor of Commercial Law. In 2017, she was appointed to a temporary professorship in international commercial law at Radboud University Nijmegen. She was elected Fellow of the British Academy in 2019. On 1 October 2019, she was elected Rouse Ball Professor of English Law in the University Of Cambridge, following the retirement of her predecessor David Feldman. She is the first woman to hold this professorship. She has held visiting professorships at the National University of Singapore, City University of Hong Kong, Leiden University, and Paris-Sorbonne University.

Professor Gullifer is a General Editor of the Cambridge Law Journal.

References 

Living people
British barristers
British legal scholars
Alumni of Hertford College, Oxford
Fellows of Brasenose College, Oxford
Fellows of Harris Manchester College, Oxford
Academic staff of Radboud University Nijmegen
Fellows of the British Academy
Rouse Ball Professors of English Law
Members of Gray's Inn
Year of birth missing (living people)